Located in the campus of Université fédérale de Toulouse Midi-Pyrénées in France, École nationale supérieure de formation de l’enseignement agricole is a renowned Agricultural school, with roots back to 1963 as the École nationale de formation agronomique, re-organised in 2016 as École nationale supérieure de formation de l’enseignement agricole.
It is one of the Toulouse Tech school. It is one of the  national teacher training school in Agronomy in France.
ENSFEA also offers bachelor's degree, Master's and PhDs.

Research at ENSFEA 
 “Rural Dynamics” Laboratory
 « Biological Evolution and Diversity » Research Laboratory
 Economics, Policies and social systems Laboratory
 Education Sciences Laboratory

References

External links
 Official website

Engineering universities and colleges in France
Grandes écoles
Universities and colleges in Toulouse
Educational institutions established in 1963
1963 establishments in France